Chrysopsyche imparilis is a moth of the family Lasiocampidae first described by Per Olof Christopher Aurivillius in 1905. It is found in Nigeria, Senegal and South Africa.

Biology
Food plants of this species are Terminalia species (Combretaceae), Combretum species and Gossypium.

References

External links

Lasiocampinae
Insects of the Democratic Republic of the Congo
Insects of West Africa
Moths of Africa